Waylla Q'asa (Quechua waylla meadow, q'asa mountain pass, "meadow pass", also spelled Huaylla Khasa) is a  mountain in the Bolivian Andes. It is located in the Potosí Department, Tomás Frías Province, Yocalla Municipality.

References 

Mountains of Potosí Department